Liolaemus multiformis is a species of lizard in the family Iguanidae.  It is found in Bolivia and Peru.

References

multiformis
Lizards of South America
Reptiles of Bolivia
Reptiles of Peru
Reptiles described in 1875
Taxa named by Edward Drinker Cope